The British Pharmacological Society is the primary UK learned society for pharmacologists concerned with research into drugs and the way they work. Members work in academia, industry, regulatory agencies and the health services, and many are medically qualified. The Society covers the whole spectrum of pharmacology, including laboratory, clinical, and toxicological aspects.

Clinical pharmacology is the medical speciality dedicated to promoting safe and effective use of medicines for patient benefit. Clinical pharmacologists work as consultants in the National Health Service and many hold prominent positions in UK universities.

History
The Society was founded in 1931, in Oxford, by a group of about 20 pharmacologists. They were brought together on the initiative of Professor James Andrew Gunn, by a letter signed by Gunn, H.H. Dale, and W.E. Dixon and sent to the heads of departments for teaching pharmacology and of institutions for pharmacological research in Great Britain, with proposals for the formation of a pharmacological club. There were favorable replies to this letter, and most of the recipients met in Wadham College on the evening of 3 July 1931, the day before the meeting of the Physiological Society. Gunn presided over the meeting. It was agreed that a Society should be founded to meet at least once a year for the reading of papers on pharmacological subjects and the discussion of questions of teaching and publications and to promote friendly relations between pharmacologists.

The first female member of the society was Mary Pickford (1935), and other early, eminent women include Marthe Vogt and Edith Bülbring.

Publications
The British Pharmacological Society publishes several works which promote pharmacology:
British Journal of Pharmacology is published by Wiley
British Journal of Clinical Pharmacology is published by Wiley
Pharmacology Research & Perspectives is published by ASPET, British Pharmacological Society and Wiley.
pA2 is the e-journal of the British Pharmacological Society.
Pharmacology Matters is the magazine of the British Pharmacological Society.

Presidents 
Secretary and Treasurer
 1931 - M. H. MacKeith
 1934 - Joshua Harold Burn
 1945 - Frank R. Winton
Secretary
 1947 - G. Brownlee
 1952 - D. R. Wood
 1955 - M. Weatherall
 1956 - D. R. Wood
 1957 - W.L. M. Perry
 1961 - J. D. P. Graham
General Secretary
 1968 - J. P. Quilliam
 1971 - John R. Vane
 1974 - J. F. Mitchell
 1977 - G. P. Lewis
 1980 - A. M. Barrett
 1983 - T. Birmingham
 1986 - G. N. Woodruff
 1989 - A. R. Green
 1992 - J.  Maclagan
 1995 - N.G. Bowery
 1998 - T. P. Blackburn
President
 1999 - N.G. Bowery
 2001 - Rod. J. Flower
 2004 - J. C. Buckingham
 2006 - G. Henderson
 2008 - Jeff K. Aronson
 2010 - Raymond G. Hill
 2012 - Phil A. Routledge
 2014 - Humphrey P. Rang 
 2016 - David Webb
 2018 - Steve Hill

Eminent pharmacologists
The society elects eminent, deceased contributors to the subject of pharmacology, whether or not they were members, to the Pharmacology Hall of Fame:
James Black
Bill Bowman
Edith Bülbring
Henry Hallett Dale
Derrick Dunlop
John Gaddum
Hans Kosterlitz
Heinz Otto Schild
John Vane
Marthe Vogt

Members of the society awarded the Nobel Prize in Physiology or Medicine include Black, Dale and Vane.

Fellows of the society
Fellowships (FBPhS) of the society are awarded to members who have made significant contributions to both the study of pharmacology and the Society. A full list of Fellows is available here. Honorary Fellowships (HonFBPhS) are awarded to member or non-members for distinguished and sustained leadership role in Pharmacology. Fellows and Honorary Fellows use the post-nominal FBPhS. Notable honorary fellows include:

Y S Bakhle
Michael Berridge
Thomas Blackburn
Colin Blakemore
Susan Brain
Geoffrey Burnstock
Judy MacArthur Clark
John H. Coote
David Colquhoun
Sally Davies
 Garret A. FitzGerald
Roderick Flower
Raymond Hill
Hilary Little
Ian McGrath, former editor-in-chief of the British Journal of Pharmacology
Sir Salvador Moncada
Sir Michael Rawlins
Dame Nancy Rothwell

See also
Pharmacology
Clinical pharmacology
Wiley

References

External links
The British Pharmacological Society
The British Journal of Pharmacology
The British Journal of Clinical Pharmacology
Pharmacology Research & Perspectives

Health in the London Borough of Islington
Learned societies of the United Kingdom
Medical associations based in the United Kingdom
1931 establishments in the United Kingdom
Organisations based in the London Borough of Islington
Pharmacological societies
Scientific organizations established in 1931